Baotou railway station is a railway station of Jingbao Railway, Baolan Railway, Baobai Railway and Baoshen Railway. The station located  Baotou, Inner Mongolia, China.

History
The station opened in 1956.

See also
List of stations on Jingbao railway

References

Railway stations in China opened in 1956
Railway stations in Inner Mongolia